Jonathan Samuel Hartley (born 8 January 1960) is a former English cricketer.  Hartley was a left-handed batsman who bowled right-arm medium pace.  He was born in Burnley, Lancashire.

Hartley made his debut for Oxfordshire in the 1989 Minor Counties Championship against Buckinghamshire.  Hartley played Minor counties cricket for Oxfordshire from 1989 to 1994, which included 43 Minor Counties Championship matches and 11 MCCA Knockout Trophy matches.  He made his List A debut against Gloucestershire in the 1989 NatWest Trophy.  He played 5 further List A matches, the last coming against Glamorgan in the 1993 NatWest Trophy.  In his 6 List A matches, he scored 99 runs at a batting average of 19.80, with a high score of 46.  With the ball he took 6 wickets at a bowling average of 33.66, with best figures of 2/48.

He had previously played Second XI and Minor counties cricket for the Lancashire Second XI from 1979 to 1982, later playing for the Warwickshire Second XI in 1986.

References

External links
Jonathan Hartley at ESPNcricinfo
Jonathan Hartley at CricketArchive

1960 births
Living people
Cricketers from Burnley
English cricketers
Oxfordshire cricketers